Satakunta (in both Finnish and Swedish) is a region ( / ) of Finland, part of the former Western Finland Province. It borders the regions of Southwest Finland, Pirkanmaa, South Ostrobothnia and Ostrobothnia. The capital city of the region is Pori. The name of the region literally means hundred. The historical province of the same name was a larger area within Finland, covering modern Satakunta as well as much of Pirkanmaa.

Municipalities 

The region of Satakunta is made up of 16 municipalities, of which 7 have city status (marked in bold).

Northern Satakunta sub-region:
 Jämijärvi
Population: 
 Kankaanpää
Population: 
 Karvia
Population: 
 Siikainen (Siikais)
Population: 

Pori sub-region:
 Harjavalta
Population: 
 Huittinen (Vittis)
Population: 
 Kokemäki (Kumo)
Population: 
 Merikarvia (Sastmola)
Population: 
 Nakkila
Population: 
 Pomarkku (Påmark)
Population: 
 Pori (Björneborg)
Population: 
 Ulvila (Ulvsby)
Population: 

Rauma sub-region:
 Eura
Population: 
 Eurajoki (Euraåminne)
Population: 
 Rauma (Raumo)
Population: 
 Säkylä
Population:

Politics 
Results of the 2019 Finnish parliamentary election in Satakunta:

Social Democratic Party  25.21%
Finns Party  24.10%
Centre Party  16.72%
National Coalition Party  14.15%
Left Alliance  9.96%
Green League  5.97%
Christian Democrats  2.69%
Seven Star Movement   0.16%
Swedish People's Party   0.14%
Other parties   0.90%

Heraldry 
The arms are crowned by a ducal coronet, though in Finnish tradition this resembles a Swedish count's coronet. Blazon: "Per fess Azure and Or, a bear rampant Sable, armed and langued Gules, crowned Or, holding in both paws a sword Argent, sword handle Or; surmounted by two mullets of seven Argent".

History 

According to one theory, Satakunta was a political and military entity already in the Late Iron Age of Finland (550 - 1150 AD).  During the 13th century, the Swedish rule was consolidated. At the same time, the coastal strip received some Swedish inhabitants, who however were assimilated in the mainstream Finnish population.  The remnant of the influx can be seen in some of the toponyms in coastal Satakunta (e.g. Noormarkku < ). Genetically connections to Scandinavia seem to be relatively strong. Haplogroup I1 (Y-DNA), which is typically Scandinavian, is very common in Satakunta.

During the Middle Ages, the major cities of the province were Ulvila, established in the 14th century and Rauma, established 1442. Due to the rising of land, the former was left inland and lost its access to the sea. Consequently, the city of Pori was founded to the coast by Johan, Grand Duke of Finland in 1558. Administratively, the province lost its function in 1649 when it was combined with Southwest Finland to form Turku and Pori County. In the 19th century, the eastern parts of the province were transferred to the Tavastia County. At the present, the eastern part of the old province has formed the region of Pirkanmaa and the western part forms the region of Satakunta.

Satakunta, with the rest of Finland, was separated from Sweden when Finland was ceded to Russia in 1809. During the era of Autonomy (1809–1917), the province experienced slow industrialization, Pori becoming the most important industrial city of the region. The forest and textile industries dominated the business life. In addition, the merchants of Rauma and Pori had impressively large fleets of sailpowered merchantmen, which made up a large fraction of the total merchant navy of the Russian empire. The large-scale use of sail ships continued until the 1930s, even while the steampower started to dominate the international seatraffic. The building of the Tampere–Pori and Kokemäki–Rauma railroads connected the province into Finnish inland and diminished the importance of unnavigable Kokemäenjoki river as a means of transport. After this, the ports of Rauma and Pori have remained among the most important export ports for the Finnish industry.

The development of agriculture towards market-based economy was started during the 18th century, when crop rotation and large-scale drainage projects were initiated. At the same time, clearing of forests for agricultural use continued, leading into the formation of a large crofter class, living on small-holdings rented from larger farms. During the 19th century the social divisions among the rural population deepened. Consequently, in Finnish Civil War of 1918, Satakunta formed an important part of Red Finland.

Since independence, the development of Satakunta has followed the general Finnish pattern. The rural areas have suffered from the drain of young population towards population centers, which until the early 1990s benefited the industrial cities of Rauma, Harjavalta and Pori with their surroundings. The metal and forest industries expanded steadily, necessitating the building of the nuclear plant at Olkiluoto. The increase of industrial production was not fully without problems, however. Especially the area around Harjavalta copper–nickel smelting plant suffered heavily from acid rain and Kokemäenjoki became heavily polluted. These problems have been controlled to large extent since the 1980s.

Since the 1990s, the traditional industries of the region have more or less stagnated and the relative importance of her cities has dwindled. One of the perceived reasons for this development has been the fact that Satakunta lacks a university of its own.

Geography

The exact borders of Satakunta towards Southwest Finland, Ostrobothnia and Southern Tavastia are rather well-defined. However, this is not the case with the Northern Tavastia, i.e. in the modern day region of Pirkanmaa. This is because northern parts of Pirkanmaa were only sparsely inhabited wilderness and the borders of the provinces were never well defined before the introduction of county system in 1634. In that year, the border between Turku and Pori County which included Satakunta, and Uusimaa and Tavastia county was rather arbitrarily drawn in Tammerkoski. To further complicate matters, Tampere with her surroundings was transferred to Tavastia Province in the 19th century. As a result, the region around Ikaalinen and Parkano is variously described as being part of Satakunta, Tavastia, Sata-Häme or Pirkanmaa.

Satakunta is characterized by a strong contrast of coast and inland areas. The southernmost part of the coast is flanked by the archipelago of Rauma but towards north, the number of coastal islands decreases markedly. The seabed is flat and due to this, the still-continuing post-glacial rising is perceivable even during a single person's lifetime. The dominating feature of the northern coast of Satakunta is the delta of Kokemäenjoki northwest of the town of Pori.

The valley of river Kokemäenjoki and the area south of it form one of the most important agricultural regions of Finland. The main crops are rye, barley, potato and sugar beet. On the other hand, north of Kokemäenjoki valley, forests dominate the landscape and population density is much lower than in southern Satakunta. Towards inland, the flat agricultural plain gives way to a more hilly landscape blotted by lakes. In this area, the population centers are located along the most important waterways, as a result of the original inhabitation period.

Economics

In 2019 the biggest tax payers in Satakunta were Boliden Harjavalta, Raumaster, Forchem, Länsi-Suomen Osuuspankki, Oras, Alfa Laval Aalborg and LähiTapiola Lännen.

References

External links 

 Regional Council of Satakunta website

 
Western Finland Province
Regions of Finland